Union Square Theatre was the name of two different theatres near Union Square, Manhattan, New York City.  The first was a Broadway theatre that opened in 1870, was converted into a cinema in 1921 and closed in 1936.  The second was an Off-Broadway theatre that opened in 1985 and closed in 2016.

58 East 14th Street
The first theatre with this name in New York City was located at 58 East 14th Street. It opened in 1870 and played a mixture of plays and operettas. It staged Oscar Wilde's first play, Vera; or, The Nihilists. After 1883, it hosted vaudeville as part of the Keith-Albee-Orpheum circuit. In 1921, it was renamed the Acme Theatre and converted into a cinema that eventually showed Soviet films and closed in 1936. The original structure was revealed during a November 1992 demolition of Union Square between 4th Avenue & Broadway, and was finally demolished in December. Today this is the location of Virgin Entertainment.

Selected productions

 Led Astray by Dion Boucicault (1873, 161 perf.)
 The Two Orphans (December 21, 1874, 180 perf.) 
 Rose Michel by Steele MacKaye (December 14, 1875, over 100 perf.) 
 A Celebrated Case (January 23, 1878, 111 perf.) 
 The Banker's Daughter by Bronson Howard (November 30, 1878, 137 perf.) 
 My Partner by Bartley Campbell (September 16, 1879, 39 perf; short run, but became a popular play)
 The Lights o' London (December 1881) 
 A Parisian Romance (January 11-April 7, 1883)
 A Moral Crime (September 7, 1885) 
 The Henrietta by Bronson Howard (September 26, 1887, 155 perf.)
 La Soirée (November 2013 to May 2014)

Notable people
 Jennie Kimball, actor, soubrette, theatrical manager
 Jessie Vokes, actress and dancer

100 East 17th Street
The second theatre was located at 100 East 17th Street (also known as 44 Union Square) in the former Tammany Hall building, built in 1929.  It opened in 1994 and was operated by Liberty Theatres. On January 3, 2016, the theater was closed as part of a complete renovation of the building, including the planned demolition of the theatre. Its longest-running productions were Slava's Snowshow, for 28 months, and Wit, for 18 months. Its final production was The 39 Steps.

Selected productions
 The 39 Steps, April 2015–January 2016
Murder Ballad, May 7, 2013 – July 21, 2013
 Slava's Snowshow, September 2004–January 2007
 Bat Boy: The Musical, book by Keythe Farley and Brian Flemming and music and lyrics by Laurence O'Keefe, March 2001–December 2001
 Wit, October 1998–April 2000
 The Laramie Project by Moises Kaufman and the Members of the Tectonic Theater Project, 2000
 Visiting Mr. Green by Jeff Baron, 1997–1998
 Eating Raoul, 1992
(Source: Internet Off-Broadway Database)

References

External links
Union Square Theatre at Internet Off-Broadway Database

Off-Broadway theaters
Theatres in Manhattan
Union Square, Manhattan